In geometry, the nine-point conic of a complete quadrangle is a conic that passes through the three diagonal points and the six midpoints of sides of the complete quadrangle.

The nine-point conic was described by Maxime Bôcher in 1892. The better-known nine-point circle is an  instance of Bôcher's conic. The nine-point hyperbola is another instance.

Bôcher used the four points of the complete quadrangle as three vertices of a triangle with one independent point:
Given a triangle  and a point  in its plane, a conic can be drawn through the following nine points:
 the midpoints of the lines joining  to the vertices, and
 the points where these last named lines cut the sides of the triangle.

In 1912 Maud Minthorn showed that the nine-point conic is the locus of the center of a conic through four given points.

References

 Fanny Gates (1894) Some Considerations on the Nine-point Conic and its Reciprocal, Annals of Mathematics 8(6):185–8, link from Jstor.
 Eric W. Weisstein Nine-point conic from MathWorld.
 Michael DeVilliers (2006) The nine-point conic: a rediscovery and proof by computer from International Journal of Mathematical Education in Science and Technology, a Taylor & Francis publication.
 Christopher Bradley The Nine-point Conic and a Pair of Parallel Lines from University of Bath.

Further reading
 W. G. Fraser (1906) "On relations of certain conics to a triangle", Proceedings of the Edinburgh Mathematical Society 25:38–41.
 Thomas F. Hogate (1894) On the Cone of Second Order which is Analogous to the Nine-point Conic, Annals of Mathematics 7:73–6.
 P. Pinkerton (1905) "On a nine-point conic, etc.", Proceedings of the Edinburgh Mathematical Society 24:31–3.

External links 
 Nine-point conic and Euler line generalization at Dynamic Geometry Sketches

Euclidean plane geometry
Projective geometry